And Along Come Tourists is a 2007 German dramatic film that was written and directed by Robert Thalheim. The principal characters are a young German doing civilian service at the former German Auschwitz concentration camp and an elderly camp survivor living there. Thalheim himself did his civilian service (Zivildienst) at the International Youth Meeting Center in Oświęcim/Auschwitz in 1996–1997, and portions of the film were shot at the Center and in the nearby town of Oświęcim, Poland. Filming was not permitted at the site of the concentration camp itself, where more than one million persons had been murdered by the end of the Second World War in 1945.

The principal performers are Alexander Fehling as Sven Lehnert and Ryszard Ronczewski as the survivor Stanislaw Krzemiński. Barbara Wysocka plays Ania Łanuszewskaa, a young Polish woman from Oświęcim with whom Sven develops a romantic relationship.

The film premièred on 16 August 2007 in Germany; its North American première was on 12 September 2007 at the Toronto International Film Festival. In 2010 and 2011 the film was broadcast on German television.

In 2007 Bonnie J. Gordon wrote of the film that it is "a quiet triumph ... economically blends modern life's truths, such as the fragility of 20-something love affairs, with universal themes, such as the search for meaning and the human need to expiate guilt." Jürgen Fauth wrote "Without ever resorting to preachiness, Thalheim, who was a Zivi at Auschwitz himself, offers incisive insights into the thorny contradictions and treacherous cross-currents of guilt and memory that turn any kind of exploration of the overbearing past into a minefield."

The film was nominated for the German Film Award for Best Fiction Film (the "Lola").

A DVD version of the film was released in Europe in 2008. A region 1 DVD (for North America) has not been released.

References

Further reading
 Joint interview of Thalheim, Hans-Christian Schmid, and Britta Knöller about the film.
 This academic article discusses the film in the larger context of Holocaust remembrance and memorials in the 21st century, and contains citations to several related articles.

External links 
  Official website for film.
 
 Trailer

2007 films
2000s German-language films
2007 drama films
Films about the aftermath of the Holocaust
Films set in Poland
German drama films
German prison films
2000s German films